Pohang Wooridul Hospital is a medical institution designated by North Gyeongsang Province, South Korea, in 2016 and the first hospital in Pohang to been certified as a medical institution by the Ministry of Health and Welfare in 2013. It specialises in  spinal therapy and research.

Scale of facilities
Number of beds - 95 beds
Medical personnel – 91
Operation of a foreign sub-specialty fellowship training course (neurosurgery, orthopedics)
Host of Asia-MISS (minimally invasive spine surgery
Operation of a Society for Minimally Invasive Spinal Surgery Program (didactic course)

Specialized medical technology
Percutaneous endoscopic lumbar discectomy
Percutaneous endoscopic cervical discectomy

Programs and services
Cervical
Percutaneous endoscopic cervical discectomy
Anterior cervical discectomy and fusion

Thoracic
Percutaneous endoscopic thoracic discectomy
Lumber
Percutaneous and open spine surgery

References

Hospitals in South Korea
Teaching hospitals in South Korea